The Oceans Seven is a marathon swimming challenge consisting of seven open water channel swims. It was devised in 2008 as the swimming equivalent of the Seven Summits mountaineering challenge. It includes the North Channel, the Cook Strait, the Molokaʻi Channel, the English Channel, the Catalina Channel, the Tsugaru Strait and the Strait of Gibraltar.

List of Oceans Seven swims 

 The North Channel: between Ireland and Scotland, 21 miles (34 km)
 The Cook Strait: between New Zealand’s North and South Islands, 16 miles (26 km)
 The Molokaʻi Channel (also known as the Kaiwi Channel): between Moloka’i and O’ahu, 27 miles (44 km)
 The English Channel: between England and France, 21 miles (34 km)
 The Catalina Channel: between Santa Catalina Island and Los Angeles, 20 miles (32 km)
 The Tsugaru Strait: between the Japanese islands of Honshu and Hokkaido, 12 miles (20 km)
 The Strait of Gibraltar: between Spain and Morocco, 10 miles (16 km)

List of successful completions 
The LongSwims Database maintains a list of swimmers who have completed the challenge:

See also 
 Long-distance swimming 
 Open water swimming
 Triple Crown of Open Water Swimming

References

 Sataline, Suzanne (2010); "Extreme Swimmers Accept the Challenge of 'Oceans Seven'"; Wall Street Journal.  Retrieved October 16, 2010.

Swimming
Open water swimming